Astrid Guyart (born 17 March 1983) is a French right-handed foil fencer, author, and aerospace engineer.

A three-time Olympian, Guyart is a 2021 team Olympic silver medalist.

She is the younger sister of foil fencer and Olympic champion Brice Guyart. She is openly lesbian and was the among the six French LGBT athletes featured in the documentary We Need to Talk.

Medal Record

Olympic Games

Grand Prix

World Cup

References

External links 
 
 

French female foil fencers
1983 births
Living people
Olympic fencers of France
Fencers at the 2012 Summer Olympics
Fencers at the 2016 Summer Olympics
Fencers at the 2020 Summer Olympics
Sportspeople from Suresnes
French LGBT sportspeople
Medalists at the 2020 Summer Olympics
Olympic medalists in fencing
Olympic silver medalists for France
21st-century LGBT people